Augustine Beach Hotel is a historic hotel located at Augustine Beach near Port Penn, New Castle County, Delaware.  It was erected about 1814, and is a two-story, six bay by three bay, brick building with a gable roof.  It has a hipped roof porch and a five bay, shed-roofed brick dependency.  Its peak period of use was between about 1870 and 1920. The Hotel derives its name from one of the most colorful of Delaware's early inhabitants, Augustine Herrmann.

It was listed on the National Register of Historic Places in 1973.

References

External links

Hotel buildings on the National Register of Historic Places in Delaware
Hotel buildings completed in 1814
Buildings and structures in New Castle County, Delaware
National Register of Historic Places in New Castle County, Delaware